KFF Feronikeli is a women's football club based in Drenas, Kosovo. The club competes in Kosovo Women's Football League which is the top tier of women's football in the country. Their home ground is the Rexhep Rexhepi Stadium which has a seating capacity of 6,000.

Honours
Kosovo Women's Football League:
Runners-Up: 2018-19,

See also
 List of football clubs in Kosovo

References

Football clubs in Kosovo
Women's football clubs in Kosovo